The GRAMMY Museum Mississippi is an interactive museum located in Cleveland, Mississippi, United States, focused on the continuing musical achievements of Mississippians.

The museum opened on March 5, 2016.

Background 
The Grammy Museum in Cleveland is the sister museum of the first Grammy Museum that was established in Los Angeles. The museum opened on March 5, 2016 with the help of Mayor Billy Nowell, Cleveland Chamber of Commerce, and the advertising firm Hammons and Associates. Hammons helped produce the B.B. King Museum and Delta Interpretive Center in Indianola. The museum has many exhibits that visitors can view and learn more about as they browse the museum and recently the museum had a Beatles exhibit on display. Many events can be held at the museum as well, including: receptions, award banquets, employee parties, conferences, meetings, weddings, and special occasions.

The GRAMMY Museum Mississippi is a  music-centered museum that first began development in 2011. A non-profit organization called the Cleveland Music Foundation constructed the museum and has managed it since its opening on March 5, 2016. Its sister museum, The Grammy Museum, is located in downtown Los Angeles. While both locations have a focus on the historical and cultural importance of previous, current, and future musicians, the Cleveland location emphasizes on the ingrained lineage of the Mississippi Delta's musical influence. Similar artifacts, films, and storylines from the Los Angeles museum are displayed, while approximately 20% of the exhibits focus on Mississippi in order to highlight both Grammy winners and the musicians who influenced the music industry.

The primary case for choosing the state for the museum's location was the Mississippi Delta's deep history with music. Legendary Mississippi-native musicians including Robert Johnson, B.B. King, and Elvis Presley influenced America's most accepted music styles such as the blues, jazz, hip-hop, and rock n' roll. Mississippians represent a remarkable number of Grammy recipients when taking the state's relatively small population into consideration. In fact, as of 2011, the state holds the most Grammy winners in the United States along with many other nominees, Lifetime Achievement winners, and Hall of Famers. More specifically, Cleveland, Mississippi was selected for its notable location and the local university. Cleveland not only puts the museum in the heart of the Delta, but along Highway 61, which is directly in the middle of Memphis and New Orleans. Additionally, the city's four-year institution, Delta State University, is the state's only accredited college program for music industry studies.

The Mississippi museum, a nearly $20 million development, is a smaller, but more updated version of the Los Angeles museum. The design of the museum is meant to reflect both the glamorous aspects of the Grammys as well as the Delta's rustic culture. It features high-definition touch screens and interactive technology making it one of the most advanced museums in the nation. However, the sharecropper shacks that were homes to numerous blues musicians are replicated with the corrugated metal on the museum's exterior. Furthermore, the large front porch entrance mimics the staple southern architecture.

Exhibits 
The GRAMMY Museum Mississippi's exhibits aim to celebrate all forms of music with the goal of educating and inspiring future generations to create and explore new forms of music using the roots that have existed in this country for centuries. The Museum features a variety of exhibits that highlight the evolution of American music through history using modern technology such as touch-screens, interactive dance floors, and interactive instruments; while also featuring historical musical artifacts like instruments and clothing used by previous Grammy winners.  The main exhibit showcases the Texas Blues of Stevie Ray Vaughan's "Pride and Joy." There are also thirteen additional displays that showcase aspects of Grammy culture throughout the years.

Previous Exhibits

Special events and programs 
The museum offers a series of programs including upcoming programs and member programs. The upcoming programs include a "spotlight" artist, classic artists, artists from all over the world, and upcoming artists. An example would be "Nigel Hall". Member programs feature a more unique selection of featured programs such as, "A Celebration of" 'Pride & Joy: The Texas Blues of Stevie Ray Vaughan", "Celebrating Prince", and "Beatles Symposium 2016: From the Cavern to the Candlestick". The various programs offered reach out to a broad audience including music fanatics and students.

Location 
The GRAMMY Museum Mississippi is located in Cleveland, Mississippi at 800 West Sunflower Road.

See also 
 List of music museums

References

External links 
 

Grammy Awards
Music museums in Mississippi
Museums in Bolivar County, Mississippi
Museums established in 2016
2016 establishments in Mississippi
Cleveland, Mississippi